Goldin Financial Holdings Ltd. ( is an investment holding company based in Hong Kong.

Pan Sutong is a controlling shareholder, the Chairman of the Board and an executive Director of the company.

In 2019, the company sold a plot of undeveloped residential real estate at a loss of approximately $335 million, seeking to reduce its debt.

See also

 List of companies listed on the Hong Kong Stock Exchange
 Goldin Financial Global Centre

References

External links
 Company website

Companies listed on the Hong Kong Stock Exchange